Camille Chamoun Sports City Stadium (CCSC) is a multi-purpose stadium with a capacity of 49,500 seats, located in the Bir Hassan area of Beirut, Lebanon. The stadium, equipped with athletics facilities, is the largest in the country, and is mostly used for football matches.

As of March 2020, the stadium is ranked 210th in the list of association football stadiums by capacity.

History 

It was built in 1957 by the Lebanese Ministry of Youth & Fine Arts in the presidency of Camille Chamoun. The opening game was a friendly played against Energia Ploiești, where Lebanon won 1–0 through a goal scored by Joseph Abou Murad. The stadium was completely demolished in the Israeli Invasion of 1982. Consequently, former Lebanese PM Rafic Hariri initiated a project to rebuild the stadium in preparation for the 2000 AFC Asian Cup. The reconstruction received funding from Saudi Arabia and Kuwait, with respective contributions of 20 million and 5 million U.S. dollars. The other 75 million U.S. dollars were provided by the Lebanese government. The renovation process of the bordering "Pierre Gemayel Hall" was also included in the overall project.

Kvarner, the contracting company, said that 25 British and 115 Lebanese engineers toiled along with 850 Lebanese and Arab workers to rebuild the sports city that was originally inaugurated by the late president Camille Chamoun in 1957.

After the reconstruction, the stadium hosted the 1997 Pan Arab Games where the Lebanese president Elias Hrawi delivered an opening speech saying: "From Lebanon we say to the world; the Lebanese have returned to their heritage and unity, they have returned to build a Lebanon for heroes, youth and peace". The Lebanese PM also delivered a speech saying: "Construction won over destruction, and peace over war". Finally, the president of the Pan Arab Committee said: "This is a tournament of solidarity between the Lebanese people who have established credibility in their country and given rise to this great sporting event". "Bombs can destroy a city but can never shake the faith of believers".

The stadium was also the main venue for the 1999 Arab Athletics Championships, the 2000 Asian Cup, and the sixth Jeux de la Francophonie held from September 27 to October 3 of 2009. On 27 April 2017, it hosted a Barcelona Legends vs Real Madrid Legends game, which ended 3–2 to Barcelona.

The stadium was severely damaged to the 2020 Beirut explosion, and was made unavailable for sporting activities for the 2020–21 season. On 26 October 2020, it was reported that the stadium was temporarily converted into a storage for flour and wheat, as the explosion also led to the collapse of the wheat storage building in Beirut.

Structure 

Designed by Laceco Architects & Engineers, the stadium spans 50,000 square meters of space with 77,000 square meters of covering roofs and seven kilometers of fences. A presidential gallery of 37 seats towers over the pitch, fenced off by bullet-proof glass. In addition to a 600 square meter parking lot was built underneath the stadium and another 20,000 square meter lot outside. 

The structure is capable of absorbing earthquakes up to 8.6 degree on the Richter scale. Moreover, administration offices, a complex for Lebanon’s Olympic committee and various other sports federations, ultra-modern press centers, clinics to handle emergencies among players and spectators with a parking lot for ambulances and fire engines, have been built beneath the stands.

An indoors sports complex north to the stadium was built with a 3,300 strong spectator capacity for basketball, volleyball and gymnastics, which was scheduled to be completed by 1998.
Overall capacity: 49,500 spectators
Covered area: 12,000
Uncovered area: 43,000
Presidential stand: 150
VIP stand: 1,150
First class stand: 3,450
Press stand: available (710)
Press reception hall: available
Conference room: available (350 m²)
Interview room: available
Audio-visual press room: available
Telecommunication room: available
Commentary positions: available
Players changing rooms: 23
Referee changing room: 2
Antidrugs room: available
Press room: available
TV Studio room: available
Athletes Training room: available
Club Saloon: available
Presidential reception: available
Athletes cafeteria: available
Hospital room: available
Officials reception hall: available
Drugs Laboratory: available
VIP Saloon: available
Personnel local: available

See also 
:Category:Events at Camille Chamoun Sports City Stadium
List of football stadiums in Lebanon

References

Bibliography

External links 

StadiumDB.com pictures

 
Sports venues in Beirut
Buildings and structures in Beirut
Football venues in Beirut
AFC Asian Cup stadiums
Athletics (track and field) venues in Lebanon
Lebanon
Multi-purpose stadiums in Lebanon